Achille Dauphin-Meunier (1906–1984) was a French law professor, anarchist, and syndicalist. 

He was a member of the Club de l'horloge.

References

Carrefour de l'horloge people
1906 births
1984 deaths
20th-century  French economists

French anarchists